Preeti Dubey is an Indian field hockey player. She is part of the Indian Women's Hockey team in the 2016 Summer Olympics.

Hailing from Gorakhpur, she met MP Women's Hockey Academy coach Paramjeet Singh and shifted to Madhya Pradesh in 2014. In 2017, she has been chosen as the captain of the national women's hockey side – India A. She is an alumna of Bir Bahadur Singh Sports College, Gorakhpur.

References

External links

Indian female field hockey players
Living people
1998 births
Olympic field hockey players of India
Field hockey players at the 2016 Summer Olympics
21st-century Indian women
21st-century Indian people
Sportswomen from Uttar Pradesh
Sportspeople from Gorakhpur
South Asian Games gold medalists for India
South Asian Games medalists in field hockey